General elections were held in the Faroe Islands on 8 November 1980. The Union Party emerged as the largest party in the Løgting, winning eight of the 32 seats.

Results

References

Faroes
General election
Elections in the Faroe Islands
Faroes
Election and referendum articles with incomplete results